Alphons Boosten (20 January 1893, Maastricht – 2 January 1951) was a Dutch architect, who mostly practiced in the province of  Limburg. His works include several large housing complexes and more than twenty churches.

Especially due to the unconventional design of the latter, the architects were not granted assignments for further churches, and Ritzen moved to Antwerp in 1924. Boosten mostly designed houses until in 1929 his career as an architect of churches resumed. 
Boosten's career reached a height after the Second World War, in which many churches in Limburg had been destroyed and needed replacement. However, in 1951 Boosten died, and most of his post-war assignments were completed by other architects, including his son Theo Boosten.

References

1893 births
1951 deaths
Dutch architects
Dutch ecclesiastical architects
Dutch Roman Catholics
People from Maastricht